Utulei or Utulei is a village in Maoputasi County, in the Eastern District of Tutuila, the main island of American Samoa. Utulei is traditionally considered to be a section of Fagatogo village, the legislative capital of American Samoa, and is located on the southwest edge of Pago Pago Harbor. Utulei is the site of many local landmarks:  The A. P. Lutali Executive Office Building, which is next to the Feleti Barstow Library; paved roads that wind up to a former cablecar terminal on Solo Hill; the governor's mansion, which sits on Mauga o Alii, overlooking the entrance to Goat's Island, and the lieutenant governor's residence directly downhill from it; the Lee Auditorium, built in 1962; American Samoa's television studios, known as the Michael J. Kirwan Educational Television Center; and the Rainmaker Hotel (a portion of which is now known as  Sadie's Hotel). Utulei Terminal offers views of Rainmaker Mountain.

Also in Utulei are some of the hotels based in Pago Pago, such as Sadie’s by the Sea, and the Feleti Barstow Library (American Samoa’s central public library), which is located across from Samoana High School. The library, which has the largest selection of literature in American Samoa, was developed between 1998 and 2000 with funds from the Community Development Block Grant, a program of the U.S. Department of Housing and Urban Development.

Utulei Beach Park has an enormous fale with ornate carvings, which is used for performances and events. Smaller fales in the park are used for everyday gatherings. Across from Utulei Beach Park is the Executive Office Building and Feleti Barstow Public Library. Next to the library is the largest high school on Tutuila Island, Samoana High School. Sadie's By The Sea is one of the only beachfront hotels on Tutuila and has an outdoor swimming pool, spa, restaurant, and water equipment for rent. The restaurant, Goat Island Café, offers a combination of Samoan, Asian, and American cuisine.

History

Utulei is by tradition considered distinct from Fagatogo because it is the site of Maota o Tanumaleu, the residence of the High Chief Afoafouvale (also known as the Le Aloalii). The current holder of that title is Afoa Moega Lutu, who has held it since 1990.

Of historical interest, more than a century ago, on November 3, 1920, Warren Terhune, who was the Samoan governor at the time, committed suicide in Utulei.

During World War II, the population of the village of Utulei, around 700 inhabitants, was almost entirely displaced to make room for US military installations. One Naval officer was said to have describe Utulei as consisting of "a few native houses". The inhabitants were told to move out of the village and into the hills, and bachelor officers’ quarters and other military support facilities were built there.

After the war, in 1946, the now-vacant two-story marine barracks at Utulei were renovated and repurposed as the new Samoan Hospital, with 224 beds, 27 bassinets, a pharmacy, and a dentistry. During the year 1950, the hospital admitted 2,771 patients, and delivered about 40 percent of all babies born in American Samoa that year. Nursing needs were filled by graduates from the local nursing school. Medical needs were filled by students were selected for the Central Medical School. After the Navy's departure in 1951, however, there was a severe shortage of physicians and other health care professionals. In 1954, for example, there were only four doctors (one stateside and three European), and only one dentist. The hospital therefore depended heavily on nurses to provide its patient care.

In 1964, the Michael J. Kirwan Educational Television Center was completed. It is named for Representative Michael J. Kirwan, who was chairman of the House Appropriations Committee.

In 1980, during celebratory Flag Day military demonstrations, a U.S. Navy airplane accidentally hit the cables of the Mount ‘Alava Cable Car and crashed into the Rainmaker Hotel. All six naval personnel on board the aircraft died, as did two hotel guests.

Geography
Surface runoff - from Utulei Ridge, the Togotogo Ridge, and Matai Mountain - flows through Utulei, carried by the Vailoa Stream. The stream discharges into the sea at a point on the north side of the Pago Pago Yacht Club in Utulei.

Utulei Beach Park

Utulei Beach Park is one of only a few public parks in Pago Pago — and on Tutuila Island as a whole. It was built by the U.S. Navy in the 1940s by filling in a marshy area near the Pago Pago Harbor. Next to the park are two historic naval buildings erected in the 1940s — two of four remaining original structures built here by the Navy during World War II - as well as the Pago Pago Yacht Club and the ASG Tourism Office. The park includes a grassy area with scattered trees and picnic sites. It is used for recreational activities, such as volleyball and picnicking, and is a common gathering place for social activities and events. The adjoining beach is used for canoe racing, kayaking, and windsurfing.

In 2006, the governor proposed approving the addition of a McDonald's restaurant to Utulei Beach. He said he hoped the restaurant would boost activity during the evenings, a time when the area was usually almost deserted. This was a controversial proposal, because Utulei Beach is a designated park area that has received substantial funding from the National Park Service. The proposal was defeated.

In 2009,then-Governor Togiola Tulafono designated Su’igaula o le Atuvasa as one of the venues for the 10th Festival of Pacific Arts, slated to be hosted by American Samoa in the summer of 2010. Su’igaula o le Atuvasa is the portion of the beach closest to the former site of the Pago Pago Yacht Club (now occupied by the DDW Beach Cafe).

Another public park in Utulei is Su’igaulaoleatuvasa, which is managed by the American Samoa Parks and Recreation department.

Tourism

The $10-million A. P. Lutali Executive Office Building, constructed in 1991, is located near the Pago Pago Yacht Club. The Feleti Barstow Public Library, constructed in 1998, is located just behind the Executive Office Building. Beyond the library is a paved road that winds upwards to the former cable-car terminal on Solo Hill. A monument on the hill recalls a 1980 disaster in which a U.S. Navy airplane hit the cables and crashed into the Rainmaker Hotel, killing eight people. The cableway had been one of the world's longest single-span aerial tramways; it had been constructed in 1965 to carry TV technicians to the transmitters at the top of Mount ʻAlava. In December 1991, Hurricane Val put the cableway out of service, and it has yet to be repaired. But the Utulei terminal is still visited because of its views, including its view of Mt. Pioa (also called the Rainmaker Mountain.

Also located in Utulei are the Lee Auditorium, built in 1962, and the Michael J. Kirwan Educational Television Center. It was at this television center, during the tenure of Governor H. Rex Lee, that the pioneering practice began of broadcasting school lessons to elementary and secondary school students Guided tours of the Michael J. Kirwan TV Studios have been available in the past.

The two-story Governor's House is a wooden colonial mansion atop Mauga o Ali'i (the chief's hill), uphill from a road across which is the entrance to the Rainmaker Hotel. The mansion was constructed in 1903, and served as the residence of each of the island’s naval commanders in turn until 1951. At that point, the Department of the Interior assumed control of the mansion, and it has been the residence of every governor of American Samoa since then.

Pago Pago Yacht Club, next to the Canoe Club in Utulei, is the center of water sports activities in American Samoa. It offers game fishing, diving, canoeing, sailing, diving, and more. The historic club building, next to Pago Pago Harbor, is used as a place to retreat and for dining. The yacht club is a member of the International Yacht Racing Union and the American Samoa National Olympic Committee.

Utulei is also home to Tauese PF Sunia Ocean Center, which is the visitor center for the National Marine Sanctuary of American Samoa. It offers informative exhibits on region's ecosystems and reefs.

Goat Island Cafe is a restaurant at “Sadie's by the Sea” Hotel in Utulei. Their outdoor dining fale overlooks the beach and the Pacific Ocean.

Blunt's Point

Blunt's Point, on Matautu Ridge in Gataivai, overlooks the mouth of Pago Pago Harbor. On it are two large six-inch naval guns that were emplaced in 1941. Matautu Ridge can be reached from Utulei by walking southeast on the main road past the oil tanks, keeping an eye out on the right-hand side for a small pump house immediately across the highway from a beach, and almost opposite two homes on the bayside of the street. The track up the hill to Matautu Ridge starts behind the pump house. The lower gun is located directly over a big green water tank, and the second gun is located 200 meters farther up the Matautu Ridge. Concrete stairways lead to both of the guns. One gun emplacement is listed on the U.S. National Register of Historic Places, while the second gun has earned recognition as a U.S. National Historic Landmark. They are maintained by the National Park Service. The 3-km World War II Heritage Trail, which ends at Blunt's Point, is the most accessible and most popular trail on Tutuila Island. The ridge-top trail winds past various ancient archeological sites as well as World War II installations that were erected to fend off a potential Japanese invasion. Farther on, the trail leads into a bird-filled rainforest.

Landmarks
 Utulei Beach Park (Su'iga'ula le Atuvasa Beach Park)
 Blunts Point Battery, National Historic Landmark on Matautu Ridge
 Governor H. Rex Lee Auditorium ("Turtle House"), listed on the U.S. National Register of Historic Places
 Michael J. Kirwan Educational Television Center, listed on the U.S. National Register of Historic Places
 Rainmaker Hotel, former luxury hotel
 Tauese PF Sunia Ocean Center, visitor center for the National Marine Sanctuary of American Samoa
 Government House

Economy
At the time of the 1990 U.S. Census, there were 156 houses in Utulei village. Between 1990 and 1995, 23 new residential building permits were issued, so that, by 1995, there were 179 houses. As of 2000, there were 60 commercial enterprises registered in the village, many of which are housed in the one- or two-story buildings on the southwest side of the shoreline roadway. Smaller shops are found in predominantly residential communities upland from Samoana High School and the Executive Office Building.

Diesel fuel is delivered monthly to Tutuila Island from Long Beach, California, and Honolulu, Hawaii, supplied by Marlex and Pacific Resources, Inc. The fuel is carried by pipe from the dock area to an energy-storage tank farm operated by Marlex in the Punaoa Valley in Utulei.

Education
The American Samoa Department of Education operates Samoana High School in Utulei (originally called the High School of American Samoa). It opened in 1946, and was the first high school established in the territory.

The American Samoa Community College (ASCC), established in 1970, was located in Utulei during its first four years of operation. From 1972 to 1974, it was housed in the former Fia lloa High School building and in the former navy buildings that had once housed the High School of American Samoa. By the spring of 1972, the college had 872 enrolled students.

Feleti Barstow Public Library, the central public library for American Samoa, is located in Utulei.

Notable people
 Peter Tali Coleman, the first-appointed, first-elected, and longest-serving governor of American Samoa
Afoa Moega Lutu, politician and lawyer
Arieta Enesi Mulitauaopele, nurse and first Samoan woman to run in a gubernatorial election
Tapumanaia Galu Satele Jr., former member of the American Samoa House of Representatives

References

External links
 Utulei Beach

Villages in American Samoa
Pago Pago